A presidential election was held in Romania on 13 February 1990. Ion Iliescu was elected by the Provisional Council of National Unity (CPUN) as the body's president - hence as acting/ad interim President of Romania - in a meeting held on 13 February 1990. During that meeting, the Provisional National Unity Council (CPUN) also chose its Executive Office members. Nevertheless, the vote count was never published.

Background 

The Provisional National Unity Council (CPUN) was created on 9 February 1990, as a recomposition of the Council of the National Salvation Front (CFSN), with the inclusion of 112 political parties representatives (3 per each party), 27 national minorities representatives, and 3 representatives of the former political convicts (besides 112 representatives of the National Salvation Front or FSN for short, Romania's largest governing body during the early 1990s). This body acted as an ad interim single-chamber parliament, until the 1990 Romanian general election, when it was replaced with an elected two-chamber parliament.

References 

Romanian Revolution
Parliamentary elections in Romania
Presidential elections in Romania
1990 elections in Romania
February 1990 events in Romania